Sir Harold Gibson Howitt,  (5 October 1886 – 30 November 1969) was an English accountant  who had a distinguished military career during the First World War and who undertook a long series of important public service commissions. Notable among these was his report on the reorganisation of the British pig industry.

Howitt was born in Nottingham, the son of Arthur Gibson Howitt. He was educated at Uppingham School.

Selected publications 
 Development of pig production in the United Kingdom: report of the Advisory Committee on Development of Pig Production in the United Kingdom, HMSO, 1955

References

1886 births
1969 deaths
English accountants
Knights Bachelor
Companions of the Distinguished Service Order
Recipients of the Military Cross
English justices of the peace
Deputy Lieutenants in England
People educated at Uppingham School
Green Howards officers
20th-century English businesspeople